Rano is a Local Government Area and headquarters of Rano Emirate council in Kano State, Nigeria. Rano is a local government area in Kano State with administrative headquarters in the town of Rano. Rano local government area is a Hausa-Fulani community in the southern senatorial district of Kano State otherwise known as Kano South Senatorial District alongside Albasu, Bebeji, Bunkure, Doguwa, Gaya, Kiru, Takai, Ajingi, Rogo, Kibiya, Tudun Wada, Garko, Wudil and Sumaila local government areas. Rano local government area also forms a federal constituency alongside Bunkure and Kibiya local government areas.
It has an area of 520 km2 and a population of 145,439 at the 2006 census.
The local government area is bounded to the north by Garun Mallam and Bunkure local government areas, to the east by Kibiya local government area, to the south by Tudun Wada local government area, and to the west by Bebeji local government area.
The Rano local government council is in charge of public administration in Rano local government area. The council is led by a chairman who is the executive head of the local government.
The Rano legislative council make laws governing Rano local government area. It consists of 10 Councillors representing the 10 wards of the local government area.

The 10 wards in Rano local government area are:
Dawaki, Lausu, Madachi, Rano, Rurum Sabon Gari, Rurum Tsohon Gari, Saji, Yalwa, Zinyau, Zurgu.

The postal code of the area is 710101.

History

Rano is historically seen as one of the seven legitimate Hausa states founded by the descendants of the legendary Bayajidda. Sometime during the middle ages, it was absorbed into the Sultanate of Kano, presumably during the reign of Yaji I where the Kano Chronicle mentions Yaji ousting the King of Rano from Zamna Gaba. Rano has since remained a part of Kano.

The boundaries of Rano Kingdoms during the era stated above is as follows: 
To the west Rano was bounded to Kofar Dan-Agundi Kano
To the east Rano was bounded to Gaya Emirate
To the west Rano was bounded to Zazzau, Kaduna state
To the south Rano was bounded to Ningi, Bauchi state.

Government

Rulers
Hausa Rulers
Zamna Kogo (ruled 1001 – 1074)
Sarkuki (ruled 1074 – 1165)
Bushara (ruled 1165 – 1262)
Zamna Kogi (ruled 1262 – 1345)
Kasko (ruled 1345 – 1448)
Bilkasim (ruled 1448 – 1503)
Nuhu (ruled 1503 – 1551)
Ali Hayaki (ruled 1551 – 1703)
Jatau (ruled 1703 – 1819)

Fulani Rulers

 Dikko (ruled 1819 - 1820)
 Isyaku (ruled 1820 - 1835)
 Umaru (ruled 1835 - 1857)
 Alu (ruled 1857 - 1865)
 Jibir (ruled 1865 - 1886)
 Muhammadu (ruled 1886 - 1894)
 Yusufu (ruled 1894 - 1903)
 Ila (ruled 1903 - 1913)
 Habuba (ruled 1913 - 1920)
 Isa (ruled 1920 - 1924)
 Yusufu (ruled 1924 - 1933)
 Adamu (ruled 1933 - 1938)
 Amadu (ruled 1938 - 1938)
 Abubakar (ruled 1938 - 1983)
 Muhammadu (ruled 1983 - 1985)
 Isa (ruled 1985 - 2004)
 Ila {TAFIDA} (ruled 2004 - 2020)
 Kabiru (ruled 2020 - date)

References

Local Government Areas in Kano State